Disney Transport is the public transit system of the Walt Disney World Resort in Lake Buena Vista and Bay Lake, Florida. The system provides free transportation to guests of the resort and consists of buses, a monorail system, a gondola lift system, watercraft, a rideshare system, and parking lot trams. Most of the routes operated by Disney Transport are buses that run along the resort's public roads maintained by the Reedy Creek Improvement District and private roads. None of these modes of transportation charge a fare, which makes the entire network free to use.

Buses 
Except where monorail or ferry service exists or walking is practical, direct bus service is provided from every hotel to every park and to Disney Springs, as well as between parks. The buses are fare-free for all visitors to Walt Disney World. Bus service to and from parks typically starts 45 minutes before the park opens and ends an hour after the park closes; buses from Disney Springs to the resorts run until 2 a.m. Bus stops are located near park entrances; near Disney Springs' Town Center entrance; and along roadways inside the resort (for more expansive resorts) or near the resort's entrance (for smaller resorts).

Features 
At the resorts, there are screens that sometimes indicate when the next bus to a given park will be arriving. This technology tracks the buses through GPS technology to give projected wait times, though buses usually run at intervals of no more than twenty minutes. On board the air-conditioned, ADA-accessible buses, announcements are played to indicate points of interest and bus stops. These announcements use GPS to determine which announcements should be played at which locations. All buses are ADA-accessible and can carry two wheelchairs or mobility scooters per vehicle. Strollers must be folded before boarding the buses.

Along Buena Vista Drive between Epcot Center Drive and the Disney Springs Lime Garage, new bus lanes were installed between 2014 and May 2016 as part of the renovation of Disney Springs. These allow buses headed to/from Disney Springs and Typhoon Lagoon to use their own, exclusive right-of-way in the median of Buena Vista Drive.

Routes 
While the bus system is a hub-and-spoke paradigm, it is more akin to a traditional aviation hub-and-spoke model than to the traditional public transit hub-and-spoke model because it has multiple hubs, both primary and secondary in nature, with the routes themselves usually being non-stop. The four theme parks, Magic Kingdom, Epcot, Disney's Hollywood Studios, and Disney's Animal Kingdom, as well as Disney Springs, operate as the five primary hubs. Each of the four theme parks has service to the 22 resorts, as well as to the other parks. Disney Springs has service only to the resorts, except for one-way service from the theme parks to Disney Springs after 4 p.m. Bus service is not provided on some routes served by monorail, skyliner, or watercraft, for example between Epcot and the Magic Kingdom, and between the Magic Kingdom or Epcot to resorts on the monorail line.

Both water parks require guests to transfer at either Disney's Animal Kingdom for Blizzard Beach or Disney Springs for Typhoon Lagoon, as there is no direct service to and from Disney resort hotels. ESPN Wide World of Sports Complex is served only on select days, and only to and from Pop Century, Caribbean Beach, and All-Star Resorts. Direct transportation between the spokes (the resorts) is not provided, unless they happen to be on the same bus route. Buses also are used for internal resort guest transportation within several of the larger resorts. Disney Transport buses also carry Disney World employees around the resort. The Transportation and Ticket Center (TTC) acts as the primary hub for the Walt Disney World Monorail System, as well as a transfer point for watercraft service. As of late 2013, Disney Transport buses no longer transport visitors to the TTC; however, other bus services still use the TTC, such as the Orlando area's Lynx public bus system, which also stops at Disney University and Disney Springs' West Side section.

Beginning in 1983, buses' destinations were marked by a small colored flag on the front of the bus. At the time of the flags' introduction, the resort consisted of two parks, four hotels, the TTC, and the Disney Shopping Village; there were also three bus routes that ran exclusively within the Fort Wilderness Resort. Handbooks were provided so travelers could match the flags with the destinations. However, this became increasingly impractical as more parks and hotels were added, and the flags were retired from the buses in 1995. Now, the destination or destinations are displayed on the electronic destination sign on the fronts and sides of each bus. Newer buses (made from 2015 onward) also have destination signs on the backs of each bus.

Fleet 
Disney Transport operates a fleet of Nova Bus LFS, Gillig Low Floor, and New Flyer XD60 Xcelsior bus models. They have approximately 350 buses in their fleet with a further 50 Gillig buses on order , which would expand their fleet to 400 buses. This is an expansion from the 319 buses it had in 2012, and from approximately 289 in years prior. Since 2013, some buses have sported a new red-and-gray, or red-and-white, paint scheme with a new "Disney Transport" logo, with more buses to be repainted over the coming years. This is a change from previous livery, in which buses were painted white with a red "Disney" logo and the word "Transport" in yellow-on-purple text next to the logo.

Disney Transport has been expanding its fleet with new Gillig buses, and in 2014, it introduced new articulated New Flyer XD60 Xcelsior buses as a pilot project to increase capacity on certain routes. All Disney Transport buses run on R50 Biodiesel, a cleaner renewable diesel fuel, and in 2013, Disney Transport began testing the use of all-electric buses on its routes. The fleet currently is the third largest fleet of any Florida transportation system, behind Miami's Metrobus and the Jacksonville Transportation Authority.

The Disney Transport bus depot is located at 2451 Recycle Way, Orlando, FL 32830.

Current active fleet 
, there are approximately 470 vehicles in Disney Transport's fleet.

Past fleet

Monorail 

There are also three monorail lines from the Transportation and Ticket Center to either Magic Kingdom or Epcot, which comprise the fare-free Walt Disney World Monorail System. The three lines, and the rolling stock of twelve Mark VI monorails, are maintained by Disney and form part of the Walt Disney World transportation system. The monorails are ADA-accessible and stroller-accessible, though there is a vertical gap between the monorails and the platforms, so wheelchair users must use a portable ramp, located at each station, to board the monorail. The monorail system opened in 1971 with the Magic Kingdom "Resort" and "Express" monorail lines; the former runs in a loop between Magic Kingdom and the TTC via the Polynesian, Grand Floridian, and Contemporary Resorts, while the latter bypasses the resorts and goes directly between the TTC and Magic Kingdom via a parallel loop. The Epcot line was added in 1982. , the system is one of the most heavily used monorail systems in the world with over 150,000 daily riders.

Gondola lift 

The resort operates the Disney Skyliner gondola lift system. The three-line system connects Disney's Pop Century Resort, Disney's Art of Animation Resort, Disney's Caribbean Beach Resort, and Disney Riviera Resort to Disney's Hollywood Studios and Epcot.

Watercraft 

The resort maintains a fleet of watercraft to provide ferry access between various Disney resorts and parks. These ferries are also free to ride. While some ferry routes duplicate bus routes (for instance, the Disney Springs water taxis to the Disney Springs Resort Area duplicate buses to these same resorts), the watercraft provide an alternative way to travel from one location to another.

Strollers can be transported aboard all of the boats, and the ferries, motor cruisers, Friendship Boats, and water taxis are ADA-accessible when water conditions are favorable. Motor launches cannot accept motorized wheelchairs or unfolded wheelchairs.

Routes 
The boats with the highest capacities are the large ferries that traverse the Seven Seas Lagoon between the TTC and the Magic Kingdom. The three ferries are clad in different trim colors and are named for past Disney executives: the General Joe Potter (blue), the Richard F. Irvine (red) and the Admiral Joe Fowler (green).

Motor launches and cruisers link several places in the Seven Seas Lagoon, using colored flags to indicate the route. Launches link the Magic Kingdom to the Grand Floridian and Polynesian Resorts via the Seven Seas Lagoon, using the Gold Route. These launches also connect the Magic Kingdom to Bay Lake via a water bridge to reach the Wilderness Lodge, using the Red Route; and the Fort Wilderness Resort & Campground, using the Green Route. There is also a Blue Route motor launch between the Wilderness Lodge and the Fort Wilderness Resort & Campground, via the Contemporary Resort.

Water taxis, which also have colored flags as route indicators, link the Port Orleans Resort – Riverside (yellow), the Port Orleans Resort – French Quarter (purple), the Saratoga Springs Resort (blue), and the Old Key West Resort (green) to Disney Springs along the Sassagoula River. A fourth route, the red-flag route, ferries passengers around Disney Springs.

Friendship Boats also connect the International Gateway entrance of Epcot to the BoardWalk Resort; the Yacht and Beach Club Resorts; the Swan and Dolphin Resorts; and Disney's Hollywood Studios. They also connect Epcot's World Celebration to the Morocco and Germany pavilions in the World Showcase.

Parking lot trams 

Disney Transport is also responsible for maintaining the fleet of parking lot trams used for shuttling guests between the various theme park parking lots and their respective main entrances (except at the Magic Kingdom, where the trams drop guests off at the Transportation and Ticket Center). Because the trams require guests to transfer from one's wheelchair and to fold all strollers and wheelchairs before boarding, they are not ADA-accessible. Both the Magic Kingdom and Epcot parking lots have two tram lanes, with the Magic Kingdom trams serving the "Heroes" and "Villains" sides of the lot, while the Disney's Hollywood Studios and Disney's Animal Kingdom parking lots have only one tram lane.

The original tram tractors, which ran on compressed natural gas (CNG), were built by United Tractor of Chesterton, Indiana in 1969, while the tram cars were built by Arrow Development during the same period. However, these tractors experienced many problems including overheating, transmission issues, as well as electrical and air brake troubles and were prone to frequent breakdowns. A new fleet of tram tractors, which were custom designed and built in-house by Disney, were put into service in 1972. These tram tractors also originally ran on CNG, but were converted to run on diesel fuel only a few years after entering service due to numerous problems encountered with using CNG. Over the years, these problems were slowly resolved and the tractors were eventually converted back to running on CNG starting in the late 1990s and into the early 2000s. Beginning in late 2010 and throughout 2011, safety doors were added to all of the tram cars along with outward facing speakers so that guests waiting to board the trams could hear the safety announcements more clearly. The 1972 tractors remained in service for over forty five years until late 2016, when Disney began testing a new tram tractor prototype at Disney's Animal Kingdom. The new tractor ran on propane, which made it quieter and more fuel efficient. Following successful testing, Disney upgraded the entire tram tractor fleet to the new propane-fueled tractors throughout 2017.

Minnie Van 

The vehicle for hire service named after Minnie Mouse began testing in July 2017, with the first Minnie Van service being offered to guests staying at Disney's BoardWalk Resort, Disney's Yacht Club Resort, and Disney's Beach Club Resort at the end of that month. The service is now available to all visitors on Walt Disney World property, whether overnight resort guests or not, including transportation to and from Orlando International Airport (for concierge level Guests only). Unlike the public transportation, the Minnie Vans charge a distance-based fee to transport guests anywhere within the Walt Disney World property, with preferred access to the theme park entrances. The standard vehicles are Chevrolet Suburban SUVs with capacity for up to 6 passengers and ADA accessible Ford Transit vans with capacity for up to 4 passengers plus 2 wheelchairs or electric scooters. Minnie Vans are by demand, and are requested using the Lyft mobile app. If traveling to or from the airport, they must be scheduled through Disney Signature Services.

Discontinued services 
Walt Disney World previously had its own small airport: the Walt Disney World Airport (a.k.a.: the Lake Buena Vista STOLport). During the early 1970s, scheduled passenger service was operated by Shawnee Airlines with small de Havilland Canada DHC-6 Twin Otter commuter turboprops, which had STOL (short takeoff and landing) capabilities on flights to Tampa and Orlando. The airport is no longer in operation, but the landing strip still exists and is currently used as space for offices and storage.

From late 1973 to early 1980, the steam-powered  narrow-gauge Fort Wilderness Railroad provided transportation within the Fort Wilderness Resort. Railroad ties remain in place along certain sections of the railroad's former right-of-way.

Watercraft provided service to the Discovery Island zoological attraction from its opening in 1974 to its closure in 1999. As of 2019, the island is abandoned and access is prohibited.

Incidents 

From September 25, 2013 to September 25, 2015, Disney Transport has been involved in 27 total accidents that have been reported to the Federal Motor Carrier Safety Administration, including two fatal accidents and nineteen others involving injuries.

Proposed expansions 
In 2020, Brightline and Walt Disney World announced an agreement to build a station in Disney Springs as a part of its Tampa extension, providing a high-speed rail connection to Walt Disney World and the surrounding areas. While the exact location has not been announced, the proposed station would include a lobby on the ground level, passenger facilities and an upper level train platform. In February 2020, Brightline commenced engineering and design work for the proposed project. The high-speed rail corridor between Disney Springs and Orlando International Airport will cost $1 billion and travel alongside Florida State Road 417. Passenger service is expected to start by 2026.

Notes

See also 
Rail transport in Walt Disney Parks and Resorts

References

External links 

Unofficial Map

1971 establishments in Florida
Bus transportation in Florida
Intermodal transportation authorities in Florida
No-fee ferries
 
Zero-fare transport services